"Summertime In the City"  is a single by the English indie pop band Scouting for Girls. It was released in the United Kingdom as a digital download on 26 August 2012 as the second single from their third studio album, The Light Between Us (2012). The song peaked at number 73 on the UK Singles Chart.

Music video
A music video to accompany the release of "Summertime In the City" was released onto YouTube on 24 July 2012 at a total length of three minutes and three seconds.

Track listing

Chart performance

Release history

References

2012 singles
Scouting for Girls songs
2012 songs
Sony Music singles
Songs written by Roy Stride